Vagococcus lutrae is a Gram-positive and coccus-shaped bacterium from the genus of Vagococcus which has been isolated from a otter (Lutra lutra). Vagococcus lutrae can cause infection in humans in rare cases.

References 

Lactobacillales
Bacteria described in 1999